Pomponio de Magistris (died 1614) was a Roman Catholic prelate who served as Bishop of Terracina, Priverno e Sezze (1608–1614).

Biography
Pomponio de Magistris was born in Sonnino, Italy.
On 28 Jan 1608, he was appointed during the papacy of Pope Paul V as Bishop of Terracina, Priverno e Sezze.
On 10 Feb 1608, he was consecrated bishop by Mariano Pierbenedetti, Cardinal-Priest of Santa Maria in Trastevere, with Marco Cornaro, Bishop of Padua, and Metello Bichi, Bishop Emeritus of Sovana, serving as co-consecrators.
He served as Bishop of Terracina, Priverno e Sezze until his death in 1614.

References

External links and additional sources
 (for Chronology of Bishops) 
 (for Chronology of Bishops) 

17th-century Italian Roman Catholic bishops
Bishops appointed by Pope Paul V
1614 deaths
People from Sonnino